Tracer is a video game developed by short-lived Ottawa, Canada studio Future Endeavors and published by 7th Level for the PC.

Gameplay
Tracer is an action-puzzle game in which the player is a contract hacker who is trying to outrun a virus in cyberspace that has been sent to hunt the player down after being setup by a client.

Reception

Next Generation reviewed the PC version of the game, rating it three stars out of five, and stated that "as far as this sort of thing goes, the game is certainly worth a look."

Reviews
Computer Games Magazine (1996)
Computer Gaming World (Oct, 1996)
Review in Score (Czech magazine)
PC Player (Germany) - Jul, 1996
GameSpot - Jul 18, 1996
PC Games - Aug, 1996

References

External links

7th Level games
1995 video games
Hacking video games
Puzzle video games
Video games developed in the United States
Windows games
Windows-only games